Ove Pihl (born 2 May 1938) is a Swedish art director, book publisher and graphic designer. He is mostly known as founder of the advertising agency Falk & Pihl and the publishing companies Atlantis and Page One Publishing. Ove Pihl is now an active artist with a number of exhibitions.

Early years in advertising
Ove Pihl received his degree from Beckman’s School of Design, Stockholm, in 1959 and from School of Visual Arts, New York, in 1963. Among his teachers at SVA were the legendary graphic artists Milton Glaser, Tony Palladino and Ivan Chermayeff. In 1962, Ove Pihl submitted pupils’ work to the exhibition ’Graphic Design USA’ in Moscow. He received his first award from the Type Directors Club in New York the same year. During his time in New York Pihl worked as graphic designer for Lippincott & Margulies and as art director for McCann Erickson.

After returning to Stockholm, Ove Pihl was employed by the advertising agency Ervaco Annonsbyrå, where he created the campaign for the shift to right hand traffic in Sweden, in collaboration with Björn Bunge. In 1968 he was employed by Arbmans Annonsbyrå, where he became partner in 1969. There he created numerous successful campaigns for, among others, Gulf, Semper AB, and the newspaper Expressen.

Falk & Pihl
In 1971 Ove Pihl founded a new advertising agency in collaboration with Lars Falk, Lars Hansson, Ulf Rådegård, and Magnus Åkerlind. In 1974 Ove Pihl and Lars Falk reorganized the company into Falk & Pihl. It quickly became one of the leading advertising agencies in Sweden, with clients such as SAAB, Ericsson, Semper, Frionor, Uplandsbanken, Pommac, SSAB, PK-Banken, Cederroths, Fiat, Mazda, the Swedish Parliament, Tor Line, A Smoke-free Generation, and Vegete. Falk & Pihl won several awards for their innovative advertising. In 1983 Falk & Pihl was purchased by the legendary American advertising agency Doyle Dane Bernbach.

Atlantis
In 1974 Ove Pihl, with Kjell Peterson, founded the book publishing company Atlantis, which became renowned for exquisitely designed non-fiction books and ambitious issues of classical literature.

Page One Publishing
In 1990 Ove Pihl, together with Robert Malmkvist, founded the book publishing company Page One Publishing. It specialized in the creation and production of high-quality non-fiction books, approaching clients through sales channels outside of the established book market. In 1998 Page One Publishing mastered the largest Swedish book production ever in one single printing – one million bounded copies - for the telecom company Telia. The book was aimed at the entire Swedish population and dealt with the new information technology. For twenty years Page One Publishing has created and produced more than 4 million non-fiction books distributed over large parts of Europe. Among notable clients are Åhléns, IKEA, H&M, the Swedish armed forces, Indiska, Stockholm Energi, Gant, University College of Arts, Crafts and Design, Swedish Royal Court, Swedish Mail, COOP, Hemköp, Atlas Copco, Carrefour, Scania. Se bildspelet "An Amazing Creative Life"

Education
Enskede Läroverk, Stockholm

Beckman School of Design, Stockholm

School of Visual Arts, New York

Advertising agencies
Svenska Telegrambyrån Advertising, Stockholm

Lippincott & Margulies, New York

McCann Erickson, New York

Ervaco Advertising, Stockholm

Arbman Advertising, Stockholm (partner)

Falk & Pihl Advertising, Stockholm (founder, partner, president)

Falk & Pihl /Doyle Dane Bernbach, Stockholm (creative director)

Publishing companies
Atlantis Publishing, Stockholm (founder, partner)

Page One Publishing, Stockholm (founder, partner, president)

Awards
Type Directors Club, New York 1962

Graphic Design USA, Moscow 1962

Swedish Art Directors Club, numerous Golden Egg awards

and numerous awards in international competitions 1970 - 1980

Elected to the "Advertising Hall of Fame" Platinum Academy 1986

"Pour le Merite Gastronomique" M. Sandahl Foundation 1992

Diploma Award - The Academy of Gastronomy 1998

Jury work
Jury on numerous occasions in the Swedish "Golden Egg" competitions 1965 - 1985

Chairman of the jury of the "Golden Egg" awards 1994

Jury "Excellent Swedish Design" 1984

National jury Clio - awards 1983

Jury International Posters, Berlin 1988

Clio Executive Jury, San Francisco 1996

Teaching 
Head teacher and founder of "A & O" Advertising Concept Art / Copy

Berghs School of Advertising, Stockholm 1988 - 1992

Board of directors
Beckmans School of Design 1975 - 1980

Berghs School of Advertising 1988 - 1992

Royal Swedish College of Art 1994 - 1996

Sandell Sandberg Advertising Agency 1998 - 2000

Silk & Clean AB 2006 - 2009

Advertising exhibitions
Doyle Dane Bernbach "Falk & Pihl Advertising" New York 1986

Landskrona Museum "Ove Pihl, retrospective" 2007

Paintings exhibitions 
Pierre & Peters Interior, Stockholm 2017

Pierre & Peters Interior, Stockholm 2016

Galleri Sjöhästen, Nyköping 2016

Pierre & Peters Interior, Stockholm 2015

Stensalen, Stockholms Slott 2014

KonstnärsBaren, Stockholm 2013

Pierre & Peters Interior, Stockholm 2012

Hotell Anglais, Stockholm 2011

Galleri Sjöhästen, Nyköping 2010

Galleri Diplomat, Stockholm 2010

Galleri Ewerts, Nyköping 2009

Chateau I´Arnaude, Frankrike 2008

Galleri Roddarhuset, Vaxholm 2008

Galleri Gummesons, Stockholm 2008

Pontus by the Sea, Stockholm 2007

Sturehov, Stockholm 2006

Galleri Gummesons, Stockholm 2005

Galleri Gummesons, Stockholm 2004

Notes

References 

 "Det är aldrig berättat. Ove Pihl 30 år i reklamvärlden" Audiobook on Youtube (It Is Never Told, Ove Pihl 30 Years in Advertising) by Bengt Danielsson Wahlström & Widstrand Publishing, Sweden.
"Det är aldrig berättat. Ove Pihl 30 år i reklamvärlden". (Audiobook) (It Is Never Told, Ove Pihl 30 Years in Advertising) by Bengt Danielsson Wahlström & Widstrand Publishing, Sweden.
 Samtal med Ove Pihl 2018. (Talk with Ove Pihl. The truth about the new Swedish advertising in the 60s and 70s. Swedish advertising guru Ove Pihl)
Hemma hos konstnären Ove Pihl (The home of the artist Ove Pihl)
Prinsen av Sörmland (The Prince of Sörmland)
Guldägget Vinnare 1988 (The Golden Egg)

External links 

 An Amazing Creative Life The Advertising Years. The Publishing Years. The Paintings. 
 Ove Pihl Paintings

1938 births
Swedish businesspeople
Living people